Cồn Cỏ (also known as Tiger Island) is a rural district of Quảng Trị province in the North Central Coast region of Vietnam. It is an island and is located 27 km to the east of Mũi Lay.

This is a young volcanic island, composed of  basalt  and  basalt tuff stones of  Neogene – Quaternary age.
 
Before it became its own district, the island was in the commune of Vĩnh Quang, in Vĩnh Linh district of Quảng Trị Province. The island became a district through Decree 174/2004 NĐ-CP  of October 1, 2004. Province officials held a ceremony to create the district on April 18, 2005.

As of 2003 the district had a population of 400. The district covers an area of 2 km2, making one of the smallest districts in Vietnam. The district capital lies at Dảo Cồn Cỏ.

History
According to recent archaeological work, in the Bến Nghè area of the island, there are rock artefacts believed to date to the Stone Age, tens of thousands of years ago. In the first few centuries CE, Cham people inhabited the island.

Excavations undertaken in 1994 show that during the 17th and 18th centuries, the island was a stopover point for Vietnamese sea merchants.

During the time of the Nguyễn dynasty, the island was used to imprison convicts, and some objects such as chains and metal clasps have been found there.

Vietnam War
Due to its proximity to the Vietnamese Demilitarized Zone, during the Vietnam War, Tiger Island was used as a base for North Vietnamese military forces.

On 14 March 1965 the island was attacked by Republic of Vietnam Air Force A-1 Skyraiders.

On 27 June 1972, North Vietnamese coastal artillery on Tiger Island fired on US warships, including , supporting a landing of South Vietnamese Marines near the Cửa Việt River.

References

Districts of Quảng Trị province
Islands of Vietnam
Landforms of Quảng Trị province